Friedhelm Hildebrandt (born February 11, 1957) is the William E. Harmon Professor of Pediatrics at Harvard Medical School and Chief of the Division of Nephrology at Boston Children's Hospital. He was formerly an Investigator of the Howard Hughes Medical Institute (HHMI) and the Frederick G.L. Huetwell Professor of Pediatrics at the University of Michigan.

Early life and education 
Dr. Hildebrandt received his M.D. degree from Heidelberg University (Germany), obtained his pediatrics and nephrology subspecialty training at Marburg University Children's Hospital, and was a postdoctoral research fellow in nephrology at Yale School of Medicine (Peter Aronson & Peter Igarashi).

Research 
Dr. Friedhelm Hildebrandt identified and functionally characterized multiple kidney diseases caused by single-genes (Mendelian) including nephrotic syndrome, cystic renal ciliopathies, and congenital anomalies of the kidney 

Dr. Hildebrandt was elected to the American National Academy of Medicine in 2015, Leopoldina in 2007, and to the Association of American Physicians in 2005. He is a recipient of the Homer Smith Award of the American Society of Nephrology (2014), the Alfred R. Newton Award of the International Society of Nephrology (ISN) (2017), and the E. Mead Johnson Award from the Society for Pediatric Research (2004).

Dr. Hildebrandt’s group has identified over 80 novel causative genes of the 240 genes that are currently known to cause chronic kidney disease, if mutated. His laboratory delineated the related disease mechanisms by generating animal models of human kidney disease in mice, zebrafish, C. elegans, and Drosophila as well in cell-based systems. He demonstrated that in a very high percentage of cases with early-onset chronic kidney disease a single-gene cause may be identified. Link to pertinent publications.

References 

American nephrologists
1957 births
Living people
21st-century American physicians
Harvard Medical School faculty
German emigrants to the United States
Heidelberg University alumni
Members of the German Academy of Sciences Leopoldina
University of Michigan faculty
Members of the National Academy of Medicine
Physician-scientists